The 2021–22 Mercyhurst Lakers men's ice hockey season was the 35th season of play for the program, the 23rd at the Division I level, and the 19th season in the Atlantic Hockey conference. The Lakers represented Mercyhurst University and were coached by Rick Gotkin, in his 34th season.

Season
Mercyhurst was hoping to build on an improvement in 2021 with a strong start to their season. Early returns were mixed as the team tied four of their first eight games. Defense was an issue as the Mercyhurst goal was consistently harassed by their opponents to the tune of nearly 34 shots a game. While the team had Hank Johnson and Kyle McClellan share the starting role, neither was able to shine against the constant barrage. The Lakers nearly pulled themselves back up to .500 at the end of November when they earned a surprising split with Ohio State and there was some hope that the team was ready to turn a corner.

Unfortunately, the defensive performance got even worse afterwards and Mercyhurst went 1–10 in their next eleven matches. In that stretch the Lakers allowed no fewer than 3 goals a game and, even when the offense had a good night, their two netminders couldn't keep the puck out of the net.

By the middle of January, the team was at the bottom of the Atlantic Hockey standings and it looked like the Lakers would have to wait for another year. However, Rick Gotkin decided to put his trust in McClellan as the team's starter and the sophomore began to respond with stellar performances by the end of the month. Seemingly overnight, Mercyhurst went from allowing 5 goals a game to surrendering 1. Mercyhurst arrested their downward descent and started winning games, the most surprising coming against conference-leader, American International in mid-February.

The winning came too late for Mercyhurst to finish any higher than 7th, but it did grant the Lakers home ice advantage in the first round of the conference tournament. McLellan continued to be called upon to save the team's season and he responded with two sterling efforts, winning consecutive 2–1 games while stopping 71 shots. McLellan then backstopped Mercyhurst to an upset over the #2 seed, Canisius; while he got a bit more help from the Laker offense in terms of shots, he still needed to make every save as both games were essentially 2–1 matches (Mercyhurst scored an empty-net goal in the second game).

Mercyhurst managed to lift itself into the conference semifinal and continued to play strong, putting a scare into American International. The Lakers twice took the lead in the game but a hat-trick from AIC's Blake Bennett erased both leads. The Lakers were forced to pull McLellan to try and tie the game but the Yellow Jackets ended up netting a 5th goal as a result. That marker proved critical after Mercyhurst answered with 80 seconds to play but they could not even the score and saw their tremendous postseason run end.

Departures

Recruiting

Roster
As of August 23, 2021.

Standings

Schedule and results

|-
!colspan=12 style=";" | Exhibition

|-
!colspan=12 style=";" | Regular Season

|-
!colspan=12 ! style=""; | 

|-
!colspan=12 style=";" | 

|- align="center" bgcolor="#e0e0e0"
|colspan=12|Mercyhurst Won Series 2–0

|- align="center" bgcolor="#e0e0e0"
|colspan=12|Mercyhurst Won Series 2–0

Scoring statistics

Goaltending statistics

Rankings

Note: USCHO did not release a poll in week 24.

Awards and honors

References

2021–22
Mercyhurst Lakers
Mercyhurst Lakers
2021 in sports in Pennsylvania
2022 in sports in Pennsylvania